Qasem Soleimani (11 March 19573January 2020) was an Iranian military officer who served in the Islamic Revolutionary Guard Corps (IRGC). From 1998 until his assassination in 2020, he was the commander of the Quds Force, an IRGC division primarily responsible for extraterritorial and clandestine military operations. In his later years, he was considered by some analysts to be the right-hand man of the Supreme Leader of Iran, Ali Khamenei, as well as the second-most powerful person in Iran behind him.

As a civilian, Soleimani initially worked in construction before joining the IRGC during the Islamic Revolution in 1979. He assembled and led a company of soldiers when the Iran–Iraq War began in September 1980, eventually rising through the ranks to become the commander of the 41st Tharallah Division in his 20s. He was later involved in extraterritorial operations, and in the late 1990s became commander of the IRGC Quds Force. Following the September 11 attacks on the United States, Iranian diplomats under his direction cooperated with U.S. forces in Afghanistan to fight the Taliban. Soleimani also provided extensive assistance to Hezbollah in Lebanon. In 2012, following the outbreak of the Syrian Civil War, Soleimani helped bolster the Government of Syria and its president, Bashar al-Assad, a key Iranian ally. He ran Iran's operations in the Syrian Civil War and helped plan and organize the Russian military intervention in Syria. Following the militant expansion of the Islamic State of Iraq and the Levant in 2014, Soleimani coordinated and assisted Kurdish Peshmerga and Shia militia forces in Iraq. He masterminded Iran's intervention in Iraq and had a significant role in Iran's fight against ISIL.

Soleimani was amongst the most popular personalities in Iran, viewed by many as a "selfless hero fighting Iran's enemies", by others as a "murderer". Soleimani was personally sanctioned by the United Nations and the European Union, and was designated as a terrorist by the United States in 2005.

Soleimani was assassinated in a targeted American drone strike on 3January 2020 in Baghdad, Iraq, on the orders of U.S. President Donald Trump. The strike was strongly condemned by some, including the Iranian government, and a mass multi-city funeral was held in both Iraq and Iran for Soleimani and other casualties caused by the drone strike. Hours after his burial on 7January 2020, the Iranian military launched missiles against U.S. military bases in Iraq; while there were no deaths in the second attack, the Pentagon reported that 110 American troops were wounded in the strikes.

Early life 

Soleimani was born on 11 March 1957, in the village of Qanat-e Malek, Kerman Province. He left school at the age of 13 and moved to the city of Kerman to work on a construction site to help repay his father's agricultural debts. In 1975, he began working as a contractor for the Kerman Water Organization. When not at work, he spent his time with weight training in local gyms, or attending the sermons of Hojjat Kamyab, a preacher and a protégé of Ali Khamenei, who according to Soleimani encouraged him to "revolutionary activities".

Military career 

Soleimani joined the Revolutionary Guard (IRGC) in 1979 following the Iranian Revolution, which saw the shah fall and Ayatollah Khomeini take power. Reportedly, his training was minimal, but he advanced rapidly. Early in his career as a guardsman, he helped to prevent a Kurdish uprising in northwestern Iran.

On 22 September 1980, when Saddam Hussein launched an invasion of Iran, setting off the Iran–Iraq War (1980–1988), Soleimani joined the battlefield serving as the leader of a military company, consisting of men from Kerman whom he assembled and trained. He quickly earned a reputation for bravery, and rose through the ranks because of his role in successful operations to retake the lands Iraq had occupied, and eventually became the commander of the 41st Tharallah Division while still in his 20s, participating in most major operations. He was mostly stationed at the southern front. He was seriously injured in Operation Tariq-ol-Qods. In a 1990 interview, he mentioned Operation Fath-ol-Mobin as "the best" operation he participated in and "very memorable", due to its difficulties yet positive outcome. He was also engaged in leading and organizing irregular warfare missions deep inside Iraq by the Ramadan Headquarters. It was at this point that Soleimani established relations with Kurdish Iraqi leaders and the Shia Badr Organization, both opposed to Iraq's Saddam Hussein.

On 17 July 1985, Soleimani opposed the IRGC leadership's plan to deploy forces to two islands in western Arvand Rud, on the Shatt al-Arab River.

After the war, during the 1990s, he was an IRGC commander in Kerman Province. In this region, which is relatively close to Afghanistan, Afghan-grown opium travels to Turkey and on to Europe. Soleimani's military experience helped him earn a reputation as a successful fighter against drug trafficking.

During the 1999 student protests in Tehran, Soleimani was one of the IRGC officers who signed a letter to President Mohammad Khatami warning that if he did not suppress the protests, the military would, and suggesting Khatami would be deposed. According to the former IRGC commander, Mohammad Ali Jafari, Soleimani also intervened in the 2009 protests to "control the insecurity and riots".

Command of Quds Force 

The exact date of his appointment as commander of the IRGC's Quds Force is not clear, but Ali Alfoneh cites it as between 10 September 1997 and 21 March 1998. He was considered one of the possible successors to the post of commander of the IRGC when General Yahya Rahim Safavi left this post in 2007. In 2008, he led a group of Iranian investigators looking into the death of Imad Mughniyah. Soleimani helped arrange a ceasefire between the Iraqi Army and Mahdi Army in March 2008.

Following the September 11 attacks in 2001, senior U.S. State Department official Ryan Crocker flew to Geneva to meet with Iranian diplomats who were under the leadership of Soleimani with the purpose of collaborating to destroy the Taliban. This collaboration was instrumental in defining the targets of air bombing operations in Afghanistan and in capturing key Al-Qaeda operatives, but suddenly ended in January 2002, when President George W. Bush named Iran as part of the "Axis of evil" in his State of the Union address.

Soleimani strengthened the relationship between Quds Force and Hezbollah upon his appointment, and supported the latter by sending in operatives to retake southern Lebanon. In an interview aired in October 2019, he said he was in Lebanon during the 2006 Israel–Hezbollah War to manage the conflict.

In 2009, The Economist stated on the basis of a leaked report that Christopher R. Hill and General Raymond T. Odierno (America's two most senior officials in Baghdad at the time) met with Soleimani in the office of Iraq's president, Jalal Talabani, but withdrew the story after Hill and Odierno denied the occurrence of the meeting.

On 24 January 2011, Soleimani was promoted to Major General (Sarlaskar) by Supreme Leader Ali Khamenei. Khamenei was described as having a close relationship with him, calling Soleimani a "living martyr" and helping him financially.

Soleimani was described by an ex-CIA operative, responsible for clandestine operations, as "the single most powerful operative in the Middle East today" and the principal military strategist and tactician in Iran's effort to deter Western influence and promote the expansion of Shia and Iranian influence throughout the Middle East. In Iraq, as the commander of the Quds Force, he was believed to have strongly influenced the organization of the Iraqi government, notably supporting the election of previous Iraqi Prime Minister Nuri Al-Maliki.

A report issued, late January 2020, by government factions close to IRGC and published by Fars News Agency reveals some of Quds force's infiltration, under the command of Qassem Soleimani, in other countries. The 1992–95 Bosnian War is brought as an example.

Syrian Civil War 

According to several sources, including Riad Hijab, a former Syrian premier who deserted in August 2012, Soleimani was one of the strongest supporters of the Syrian government of Bashar al-Assad in the Syrian Civil War. Soleimani was involved in planning and carrying out the Siege of Baba Amr during the Siege of Homs since 2011, according to the Syrian Minister of Defense, Ali Abdullah Ayyoub. In the later half of 2012, Soleimani assumed personal control of the Iranian intervention in the Syrian Civil War, when the Iranians became deeply concerned about the Assad government's inability to fight the opposition, and the negative consequences to the Islamic Republic if the Syrian government fell. He reportedly coordinated the war from a base in Damascus at which a Lebanese Hezbollah commander and an Iraqi Shia militia coordinator were mobilized, in addition to Syrian and Iranian officers. Under Soleimani, the command "coordinated attacks, trained militias, and set up an elaborate system to monitor rebel communications". According to a Middle Eastern security official Dexter Filkins talked to, thousands of Quds Force and Iraqi Shia militiamen in Syria were "spread out across the entire country". The retaking of Qusayr in May 2013 from rebel forces and Al-Nusra Front was, according to John Maguire, a former CIA officer in Iraq, "orchestrated" by Soleimani.

Brigadier General Hossein Hamadani, the Basij's former deputy commander, helped to run irregular militias that Soleimani hoped would continue the fight if Assad fell. Soleimani helped establish the National Defence Forces (NDF) in 2013 which would formalize the coalition of pro-Assad groups.

Soleimani was much credited in Syria for the strategy that assisted President Bashar al-Assad in finally repulsing rebel forces and recapturing key cities and towns. He was involved in the training of government-allied militias and the coordination of decisive military offensives. The sighting of Iranian UAVs in Syria strongly suggested that his command, the Quds Force, was involved in the civil war.

In a visit to the Lebanese capital Beirut on 29 January 2015, Soleimani laid wreaths at the graves of the slain Hezbollah members, including Jihad Mughniyah, which strengthened suspicions about a collaboration between Hezbollah and the Quds Force.

Orchestration of military coalition in 2015 

In 2015, Soleimani began gathering support from various sources to combat the newly resurgent Islamic State of Iraq and the Levant (ISIL) and rebel groups which had both successfully taken large swaths of territory from Assad's forces. He was reportedly the main architect of the joint intervention involving Russia as a new partner with Assad and Hezbollah.

According to Reuters, at a meeting in Moscow in July, Soleimani unfurled a map of Syria to explain to his Russian hosts how a series of defeats for President Bashar al-Assad could be turned into victory—with Russia's help. Soleimani's visit to Moscow was the first step in planning for the Russian military intervention that has reshaped the Syrian war and forged a new Iran–Russia alliance in support of the Syrian (and Iraqi) governments. Iran's supreme leader, Ali Khamenei, also sent a senior envoy to Moscow to meet President Vladimir Putin. "Putin reportedly told [a senior Iranian envoy] 'Okay we will intervene. Send Qassem Soleimani.'" General Soleimani went to explain the map of the theatre and coordinate the strategic escalation of military forces in Syria.

Operations in Aleppo 

Soleimani had a decisive impact on the theater of operations, which led to a strong advance in southern Aleppo with the government and allied forces re-capturing two military bases and dozens of towns and villages in a matter of weeks. There was also a series of major advances towards Kuweiris air-base to the north-east. By mid-November, the Syrian army and its allies had gained ground in southern areas of Aleppo Governorate, capturing numerous rebel strongholds. Soleimani was reported to have personally led the drive deep into the southern Aleppo countryside where many towns and villages fell into government hands. He reportedly commanded the Syrian Arab Army's 4th Mechanized Division, Hezbollah, Harakat Al-Nujaba (Iraqi), Kata'ib Hezbollah (Iraqi), Liwaa Abu Fadl Al-Abbas (Iraqi), and Firqa Fatayyemoun (Afghan/Iranian volunteers).

In early February 2016, backed by Russian and Syrian air force airstrikes, the 4th Mechanized Division—in close coordination with Hezbollah, the National Defense Forces (NDF), Kata'eb Hezbollah, and Harakat Al-Nujaba—launched an offensive in Aleppo Governorate's northern countryside, which eventually broke the three-year siege of Nubl and Al-Zahraa and cut off the rebels' main supply route from Turkey. According to a senior, non-Syrian security source close to Damascus, Iranian fighters played a crucial role in the conflict. "Qassem Soleimani is there in the same area", he said. In December 2016, new photos emerged of Soleimani at the Citadel of Aleppo, though the exact date of the photos is unknown.

In late March 2017, Soleimani was seen in the northern Hama Governorate countryside in Syria, reportedly aiding Major General Suheil al-Hassan to repel a major rebel offensive.

War against ISIL in Iraq 

Soleimani had a significant role in Iran's fight against ISIL in Iraq. He was described as the "linchpin" bringing together Kurdish and Shia forces to fight ISIS, overseeing joint operations conducted by the two groups.

In 2014, Soleimani was in the Iraqi city of Amirli, to work with Iraqi forces to push back ISIL militants. The Los Angeles Times reported that Amirli was the first town to successfully withstand an ISIL invasion, and was secured thanks to "an unusual partnership of Iraqi and Kurdish soldiers, Iranian-backed Shia militias and U.S. warplanes".

A senior Iraqi official told the BBC that when the city of Mosul fell, the rapid reaction of Iran, rather than American bombing, was what prevented a more widespread collapse. Soleimani also seems to have been instrumental in planning the operation to relieve Amirli in Saladin Governorate, where ISIL had laid siege to an important city. In fact, the Quds force operatives under Soleimani's command seem to have been deeply involved not only with the Iraqi army and Shia militias but also with the Kurdish forces in the Battle of Amirli, providing liaisons for intelligence-sharing along with arms, munitions and expertise.

In the operation to liberate Jurf Al Sakhar, he was reportedly "present on the battlefield". Some Shia militia commanders described Soleimani as "fearless", one pointing out that the Iranian general never wears a flak jacket even on the front lines.

In November 2014, Shia and Kurdish forces under Soleimani's command pushed ISIL out of the Iraqi villages of Jalawla and Saadia in the Diyala Governorate.

Soleimani played an integral role in the organization and planning of the crucial operation to retake the city of Tikrit in Iraq from ISIL. The city of Tikrit rests on the left bank of the Tigris river and is the largest and most important city between Baghdad and Mosul, giving it a high strategic value. The city fell to ISIL during 2014 when ISIL made immense gains in northern and central Iraq. After its capture, ISIL's massacre at Camp Speicher led to 1,600 to 1,700 deaths of Iraqi Army cadets and soldiers. After months of careful preparation and intelligence gathering an offensive to encircle and capture Tikrit was launched in early March 2015.

In 2016, photos published by a Popular Mobilization Forces (PMF) source showed Soleimani attending a meeting of PMF commanders in Iraq to discuss the Battle of Fallujah.

CIA chief Mike Pompeo said he sent Soleimani and other Iranian leaders a letter holding them responsible for any attacks on U.S. interests by forces under their control. According to Mohammad Mohammadi Golpayegani, a senior aide for Iran's supreme leader, Soleimani ignored the letter when it was handed over to him during the Abu Kamal offensive against ISIL, saying "I will not take your letter nor read it and I have nothing to say to these people."

In politics 

In 1999, Soleimani, along with other senior IRGC commanders, signed a letter to then-President Mohammad Khatami regarding the student protests in July. They wrote "Dear Mr. Khatami, how long do we have to shed tears, sorrow over the events, practice democracy by chaos and insults, and have revolutionary patience at the expense of sabotaging the system? Dear president, if you don't make a revolutionary decision and act according to your Islamic and national missions, tomorrow will be so late and irrecoverable that cannot be even imagined."

Iranian media reported in 2012 that he might be replaced as the commander of Quds Force in order to allow him to run in the 2013 presidential election. He reportedly refused to be nominated for the election. According to BBC News, in 2015 a campaign started among conservative bloggers for Soleimani to stand for 2017 presidential election. In 2016, he was speculated as a possible candidate, however in a statement published on 15 September 2016, he called speculations about his candidacy as "divisive reports by the enemies" and said he will "always remain a simple soldier serving Iran and the Islamic Revolution".

In the summer of 2018, Soleimani and Tehran exchanged public remarks with American President Donald Trump related to Red Sea shipping which heightened tensions between the two countries and their allies in the region.

Sanctions 
In March 2007, Soleimani was included on a list of Iranian individuals targeted with sanctions in United Nations Security Council Resolution 1747. On 18 May 2011, he was sanctioned again by the U.S. along with Syrian president Bashar al-Assad and other senior Syrian officials due to his alleged involvement in providing material support to the Syrian government.

On 24 June 2011, the Official Journal of the European Union said the three Iranian Revolutionary Guard members now subject to sanctions had been "providing equipment and support to help the Syrian government suppress protests in Syria". The Iranians added to the EU sanctions list were two Revolutionary Guard commanders, Soleimani, Mohammad Ali Jafari, and the Guard's deputy commander for intelligence, Hossein Taeb. Soleimani was also sanctioned by the Swiss government in September 2011 on the same grounds cited by the European Union.

In 2007, the U.S. included him in a "Designation of Iranian Entities and Individuals for Proliferation Activities and Support for Terrorism", which forbade U.S. citizens from doing business with him. The list, published in the EU's Official Journal on 24 June 2011, also included a Syrian property firm, an investment fund and two other enterprises accused of funding the Syrian government. The list also included Mohammad Ali Jafari and Hossein Taeb.

On 13 November 2018, the U.S. sanctioned an Iraqi military leader named Shibl Muhsin 'Ubayd Al-Zaydi and others who allegedly were acting on Soleimani's behalf in financing military actions in Syria or otherwise providing support for terrorism in the region.

Personal life and public image 

Soleimani's father, Hassan, was a farmer who died in 2017. His mother, Fatemeh, died in 2013. He left behind four siblings. His younger brother, Sohrab, who lived and worked with Soleimani in his youth, is now a warden and former director general of the Tehran Prisons Organization. The U.S. imposed sanctions on Sohrab Soleimani in April 2017 "for his role in abuses in Iranian prisons". He left five surviving children: three sons and two daughters. Another child predeceased him. One of his daughters, Zeinab, was asking for revenge after her father's death. He was described as having "a calm presence", and as carrying himself "inconspicuously and rarely rais[ing] his voice", exhibiting "understated charisma". Unlike other IRGC commanders, he usually did not appear in his official military clothing, even on the battlefield. In January 2015, Hadi Al-Ameri, the head of the Badr Organization in Iraq, said of him: "If Qasem Soleimani was not present in Iraq, Haider al-Abadi would not be able to form his cabinet within Iraq".

Soleimani was a popular national figure in Iran, considered a hero by the conservatives. According to a poll conducted in collaboration with IranPoll for the University of Maryland School of Public Policy, by October 2019 Soleimani was viewed favorably by 82% of Iranians with 59% of them very favorable toward him. He was often considered the second most powerful person and general in Iran, behind Ayatollah Khamenei. Since the Iran–Iraq War (1980–88), in which Iran was attacked by Saddam Hussein's Iraq and also felt attacked by other countries which sided with Iraq, including the U.S., which supplied weapons and intelligence to Iraq, Soleimani had developed into an architect of Iran's foreign policies in the Middle East and a key figure behind Iran's foreign and defence policies. 

Soleimani cultivated public relations and a personality cult that formed part of his image. After his death, the Iranian propaganda campaign intensified disinformation efforts in coordinating the international public opinion toward idolization of Soleimani. These efforts included using state-run TV channels and several social media accounts, a large proportion of which had newly been created, and posting images such as heroic, "noble warrior" depictions of Soleimani, appealing to both nationalists and religious conservatives. It is believed by many that these measures have been at least partially successful, arguing that even some American outlets were biased.

Assassination 

Soleimani was assassinated on 3 January 2020 around 1:00a.m. local time (22:00 UTC 2January), by U.S. drone strike near Baghdad International Airport. BBC News, NBC News, DW News, Time, The Guardian and other media outlets have said Soleimani was assassinated or described the killing as an assassination. Senior officials of the U.S. Department of State compared it to Operation Vengeance in World War II, when American pilots shot down the plane carrying Japanese Admiral Isoroku Yamamoto – a comparison concurred with by The New York Times and other prominent media and pundits.

Soleimani was on his way to meet Iraqi Prime Minister Adil Abdul-Mahdi and had just left his plane, which arrived in Iraq from Lebanon or Syria. Adil Abdul Mahdi said Soleimani was bringing Iran's response to a letter that Iraq had sent out on behalf of Saudi Arabia in order to ease tensions between the two countries in the region. The prime minister did not reveal the message's exact content. Also assassinated were four members of the Popular Mobilization Forces (PMF), including Abu Mahdi al-Muhandis, the Iraqi military commander who headed the PMF. Soleimani's body was identified using a ring he wore on his finger, with DNA confirmation still pending.

Soleimani was posthumously promoted to the rank of Lieutenant General and praised as a martyr by speaker of the Iranian parliament Ali Larijani and Mohsen Rezaei, a former commander of the IRGC. Soleimani was succeeded by Esmail Ghaani as commander of the Quds Force.

According to the Iranian Students News Agency quoting the Iraqi Al-Ahd network, there are diverse narratives concerning the drones which assassinated Qasim-Soleimani (and Abu-Mahdi al-Muhandis). A narrative mentions about the American drones which took-off from Kuwait land, and entered Iraq and did the mentioned operation, on the other hand, the headquarters of the Kuwaiti Armed Forces denied the news after a few hours. The second news says that an American UAV rises from the Al-Adeed base in Qatar and do the mentioned assassination-operation. Also, according to Ahmed al-Asadi, a member of the Iraqi Parliament: "The drones which carried out the assassination-operation, were 3 American UAVs that took-off from the military-base of "Ain al-Assad" and flew in the sky of Baghdad for 20 hours on Thursday morning and then came back directly to the "Ain al-Assad" base after carrying out the assassination operation." According to Radio-Farda quoting American-media, the drones which did the assassination were from the type of "MQ-9 Reaper".

U.S. decision-making 
CNBC reported that the U.S. had been in pursuit of the general for decades. President Trump had expressed a desire to target Soleimani in a 2017 meeting with then National Security Adviser H.R. McMaster. On 13 January 2020, five senior current and former Trump administration officials told NBC News that President Trump had authorized the killing of Soleimani in June 2019 on the condition that he had been involved in the killing of many Americans, a decision backed by U.S. Secretary of State Mike Pompeo. In making the 2020 strike, the Pentagon focused on Soleimani's past actions and on deterring future such actions. The strike followed attacks on the American embassy in Baghdad by supporters of an Iran-backed Iraqi Shia militia and the 2019 K-1 Air Base attack. Anonymous officials told The New York Times that Trump had initially decided to strike at the Shia militia, but instead chose the most extreme option proposed (killing Soleimani) after seeing television footage of the attack on the embassy. The death of an Iraqi-American contractor in a rocket attack in December 2019 was reportedly also used as justification for the strike, contradicting the Trump administration's claim that Soleimani was targeted because he was plotting "imminent" attacks on Americans and had to be targeted in order to stop these attacks.

The U.S. Defense Department said the strike was carried out "at the direction of the President" and asserted that Soleimani had been planning further attacks on American diplomats and military personnel and had approved the attacks on the American embassy in Baghdad in response to U.S. airstrikes in Iraq and Syria on 29 December 2019, and that the strike was meant to deter future attacks. As part of the administration's changing justification for the strike, a national security adviser asserted that Soleimani had intended further attacks on American diplomats and troops, and Mark Esper asserted the general had been expected to mastermind an attack within days. Trump stated in a Fox News interview that four embassies, including the U.S. embassy in Baghdad, had been targeted; Secretary of State Mike Pompeo said it was not known where or when the attacks would have taken place.

Legal status of the assassination
The strike was not approved by the U.S. Congress or consented to by the Iraqi government, leading to controversy regarding the legality of killing an Iranian military leader over Iraqi airspace.

An arrest warrant was issued by an Iraqi court for President Donald Trump in connection with the killing of Soleimani. The arrest warrant was for a charge of premeditated murder, which carries the death penalty on conviction.

Under U.S. law
On 14 February 2020, in a legally required unclassified memorandum to Congress, the Trump administration said it was authorized under both the Constitution and the 2002 Authorization of Use of Military Force Against Iraq. 

However, the Chairman of the House Committee on Foreign Affairs Engel said "The 2002 authorization was passed to deal with Saddam Hussein. This law had nothing to do with Iran or Iranian government officials in Iraq. To suggest that 18 years later this authorization could justify killing an Iranian official stretches the law far beyond anything Congress ever intended," adding that he "looked forward" to Pompeo testifying in a 28 February hearing.

Under international law
The United States, as a member of the United Nations, has ratified the Charter of the United Nations and, therefore, is bound by its provisions. Agnès Callamard, United Nations Special Rapporteur on extrajudicial, summary or arbitrary executions, and Director of Columbia University's Global Freedom of Expression project, researched the alleged legal basis for the killing of Suleimani advanced by the United States government and stated that the Suleimani's killing could have been justified under international law only if it had been a response to an "imminent threat." However, she said that the United States had provided no evidence to support that contention. "Absent an actual imminent threat to life, the course of action taken by the U.S. was unlawful," Ms. Callamard wrote in a report that she presented in July 2020 to the U.N. Human Rights Council in Geneva. The Trump administration's February 2020 memorandum to Congress was "remarkably vague and inconsequential as far as a possible imminent threat is concerned," Ms. Callamard wrote in the report. "Even at the most basic level, the U.S. did not demonstrate that striking Suleimani was 'necessary.'"

Callamard also concluded that the killing sets an alarming precedent—it was the first targeted drone killing of a senior foreign government official on the territory of a third country. The world now faced "the very real prospect that states may opt to ‘strategically’ eliminate high-ranking military officials outside the context of a 'known' war, and seek to justify the killing on the grounds of the target's classification as a 'terrorist' who posed a potential future threat," Callamard said in her report. Also, she noted that scores of countries and many non-state actors now have operational drones, and that drones kill many non-combatants for every person targeted.

Reaction 

According to Agnès Callamard, the UN special rapporteur on extrajudicial killing, "the killings of Qassem Suleimani and Abu Mahdi al-Muhandis violates international human rights law". She said the U.S. is required to confirm "the individual targeted constituted an imminent threat to others." Callamard also described the killing of other individuals alongside Soleimani as "unlawful" and other scholars argue it violates international law. Russian Foreign Minister Sergei Lavrov, Medea Benjamin (the founder of anti-war advocacy group Code Pink) and Hillary Mann Leverett (a political risk consultant and former director of Iran affairs at the White House's National Security Council) called the assassination of Soleimani "flatly illegal".

Analysts Ali Vaez and Iain King and some Twitter users compared the event to the assassination of Archduke Franz Ferdinand, and #Ferdinand and #WWIII began trending on Twitter because of what BBC News called "obvious parallels [...] a single strike bringing existing tensions to boiling point". Some protesters raised concerns that Iraq could become a site of open clashes between Iran and the U.S. following the assassination of Soleimani in Baghdad and Iran's retaliatory missile attacks on U.S. bases.

Democrats, including top 2020 presidential candidates, condemned the killing of Soleimani, arguing that it escalated the conflict with Iran, and risked retaliation or war.

The Islamic State of Iraq and the Levant (ISIL) praised the killing of Soleimani as a divine intervention, saying it helped jihadists.

UK Foreign Secretary Dominic Raab, however, backed the strike, describing the American action as self-defense.

According to a Facebook spokesperson, Instagram and its parent company Facebook are removing posts "that voice support for slain Iranian commander Qassem Soleimani to comply with U.S. sanctions."

In June 2020, Iran placed an arrest warrant for President Donald Trump, with an Iranian prosecutor saying Trump and 35 others "faced murder and terrorism charges" over the killing of Soleimani.

Iran's Foreign Minister Javad Zarif said in a leaked tape that "Soleimani's death caused more damage to the country than if the U.S. wiped out an entire city."

Some activists living out of reach of the Iranian authorities, such as Saghar Erica Kasraie, Reza Alijani, and Masih Alinejad, condemned Soleimani. Some Iranians mourning for the dead of Ukraine International Airlines Flight 752 less than a week after his death called him a murderer and tore up his pictures during the protests. BBC reported that "the protests were, however, far smaller than the mass demonstrations across Iran in support of Soleimani".

Ismail Haniyeh described Soleimani as "the martyr of Jerusalem" in a speech pronounced in Tehran during his funeral.

Funeral and burial 

On 4 January, a funeral procession for Soleimani was held in Baghdad with thousands of mourners in attendance, waving Iraqi and militia flags and chanting "death to America, death to Israel". The procession started at the Al-Kadhimiya Mosque in Baghdad. Iraq's prime minister, Adil Abdul-Mahdi, and leaders of Iran-backed militias attended the funeral procession. Soleimani's remains were taken to the holy Shia cities of Karbala and Najaf. On 5 January, the remains of the bodies arrived in Ahvaz, and then Mashhad. Tens of thousands of mourners in black clothes attended the funeral procession with green, white, and red flags. Muqtada al-Sadr paid a visit to Soleimani's house to express his condolence to his family.

On 6 January, the body of Soleimani and other casualties arrived at the Iranian capital Tehran. Huge crowds, reportedly hundreds of thousands or millions, packed the streets. Supreme Leader Ali Khamenei, who had a close relationship with Soleimani, led the traditional Islamic prayer for the dead, weeping at one point in front of the flag-draped coffins. Ali Khamenei mourned openly near the coffin while the general's successor swore revenge. Esmail Ghaani, who was named commander of the Quds Force hours after Soleimani's killing, said: "God the Almighty has promised to get his revenge, and God is the main avenger." Iranian foreign minister Mohammad Javad Zarif asked if Trump had ever seen "such a sea of humanity". He was given a multi-city funeral, and his funeral procession was said to be the second largest after that of Ayatollah Khomeini. On 7 January 2020, a stampede took place at the burial procession for Soleimani in Kerman attended by hundreds of thousands of mourners, killing 56 and injuring 212 more.

Retaliation 

On 7 January 2020, the Supreme National Security Council of Iran announced that it had drafted a 13 revenge scenarios document.

The next day, the Iranian military responded to Soleimani's death by launching ballistic missiles at two U.S. bases in Iraq, resulting in no reported casualties but 100 traumatic brain injuries. Iranian officials and some Western media analysts suggested the strike was deliberately designed to avoid causing any casualties to avoid an American response. The Iranian president cautioned the U.S. that Iran will take more retaliatory actions if the U.S. continues to interfere in the region.

Execution of spy
On 20 July 2020, it was reported by Iranian state television that Mahmoud Mousavi Majd had been executed following his conviction for providing information to the US and Israel about Soleimani and the Quds force.

Anniversary  

On 3 January 2021, the first anniversary was marked of Qassem Soleimani and Abu Mahdi al-Muhandis in Baghdad. Tens of thousands of Iran-back militias marched on the highway leading to the Baghdad airport while chanting anti-American slogans.

There have been held commemoration ceremonies by the name of "Commemoration-Ceremony (Anniversary) of Martyr Qassem-Soleimani" (and Abu Mahdi al-Muhandis) in presence and virtually (via web conferencing) in the cities of the Islamic Republic of Iran and several countries, such as Oman, Iraq, Syria and Portugal.

According to Fars News Agency, the anniversary of the commemoration of Qasem Soleimani, Abu Mahdi al-Muhandis and their colleagues was held with the presence of local and foreign officials in University of Tehran, Iran.

Cultural depictions and legacy

In 2015, the British magazine The Week featured a cartoon of Soleimani in bed with Uncle Sam, which alluded to both sides' fighting ISIL.

The 2016 Persian book Noble Comrades 17: Hajj Qassem, written by Ali Akbari Mozdabadi, contains memoirs of Qassem Soleimani.

In 2017, a computer animated film, Battle of Persian Gulf II, where Soleimani is portrayed as the hero of the film.

Resalat Expressway in Tehran was renamed "Shahid Sardar Qasem Soleimani" in his honor.

On 13 January 2020, Syrian Minister of Defense Ali Abdullah Ayyoub presented the medal of "The Champion of the Syrian Arab Republic", which President Bashar al-Assad granted posthumously to Qassem Soleimani, to his Iranian counterpart, Amir Hatami.

Shortly after his death, various representations of Qasem Soleimani appeared in many wall paintings and propaganda posters in Iran. Since then, his portrait has become more and more an integral part of the iconographic representation of the Islamic Republic. 

In August 2020, Iran unveiled a new ballistic missile named Martyr Haj Qasem and a new cruise missile named Martyr Abu Mahdi after Abu Mahdi al-Muhandis, the Iraqi commander killed alongside Soleimani.

"Shahid Soleimani Plan" (also "Martyr Soleimani Project") is the name of a complementary project to fight SARS-CoV-2 during the COVID-19 pandemic in Iran, in which more than 17 million households were screened, and this screening has been performed by more than 4.5 million "health ambassadors" in Iran.

Awards and decorations

See also 

 List of assassinations by the United States
 List of Iranian two-star generals since 1979
 List of Iranian commanders in the Iran–Iraq War
 List of commanders of the Islamic Revolutionary Guard Corps
 Haj Qasem (missile)
 Mohsen Hojaji

Footnotes

References

External links

 David Ignatius, At the Tip of Iran's Spear, Washington Post, 8June 2008
 Martin Chulov, Qassem Suleimani: the Iranian general 'secretly running' Iraq, The Guardian, 28 July 2011
 Dexter Filkins, The Shadow Commander, The New Yorker, 30 September 2013
 Ali Mamouri, The Enigma of Qasem Soleimani And His Role in Iraq, Al-Monitor, 13 October 2013
 BBC Radio 4 Profile

 Qasem Soleimani
1957 births
2020 deaths
Anti-Americanism
Assassinated Iranian people
Assassinated spies
Assassinations in Iraq
Deaths by United States drone strikes in Iraq
Individuals designated as terrorists by the United States government
Iranian individuals subject to the U.S. Department of the Treasury sanctions
Iranian spies
Islamic Revolutionary Guard Corps major generals
Islamic Revolutionary Guard Corps personnel of the Iran–Iraq War
Islamic Revolutionary Guard Corps personnel of the Syrian civil war
Lur people
People from Kerman
People killed in Central Intelligence Agency operations
People of the War in Iraq (2013–2017)
Quds Force personnel
Recipients of the Order of Fath
Spymasters